The men's 60 metres event at the 2013 European Athletics Indoor Championships was held at March 1, 2013 at 17:00 (round 1), March 2, 17:15 (semi-final) and 18:40 (final) local time.

Records

Results

Round 1
Qualification: First 4 (Q) and the 4 fastest athletes (q) advanced to the semifinals.

Semifinals
Qualification: First 4 (Q) advanced to the final.

Final

The final was held at 18:40.

References

60 metres at the European Athletics Indoor Championships
2013 European Athletics Indoor Championships